Rask may refer to:

Places in Iran
Rask, Bardsir, a village in Kerman Province
Rask, Qaleh Ganj, a village in Kerman Province
Rask, Sarbaz, a city in Sistan and Baluchestan Province
Rask-i-Du or Rashk-e Olya, a village in Kuhbanan County, Kerman Province
Rask-i-Sar or Rashk-e Sofla, a village in Kuhbanan County, Kerman Province

Other uses
HNoMS Rask, two Royal Norwegian Navy patrol boats
Rask (surname)

See also
Rashk (disambiguation)